Joe Comfort (July 18, 1917 – October 29, 1988) was an American jazz double bassist.

Biography
His mother was born in Mississippi and played the organ during black and white silent movies. His father, George Comfort from Natchez Mississippi taught music at Alcorn State University and composed the school's theme played today and made sure all his children could read music. Joe's older brother George was a singer, a music teacher, and actor who performed with Dorothy Dandridge in Porgy and Bess.

A native of Los Angeles who was raised in Watts, Joe Comfort was taught trombone by his father and began his musical career with the Woodman Brother's who like Joe were also from Watts. Joe and the Woodman's used to toss their instruments in the air catching each other's woods and reeds performing extensively all over Los Angeles. In the 1940s Joe played bass in the Lionel Hampton band up until Joe was drafted for war, training at Fort Rucker, Alabama and then serving in the US Army band that went to France. Upon return, Joe worked with Nat King Cole which included extensive travel across the US and in Europe and featured on many recordings including Nat's iconic hit, Nature Boy. Joe also worked separately with Cole's guitarist, Oscar Moore. Beginning in the 1950s, he was a studio musician who recorded soundtracks and pop music with Nelson Riddle, Frank Sinatra and Ella Fitzgerald 

He was a sideman in the 1941 Fred Astaire movie You'll Never Get Rich. He is featured on a "March Milastaire (A-Stairable Rag)", a Porter song that contrasts march and jazz rhythm. Comfort played at many night clubs in Los Angeles. He died in Los Angeles.

Charles Mingus, in his autobiography Beneath the Underdog, wrote that when he was a child in the Watts section of Los Angeles, Joe Comfort taught him how to play double bass. Joe's wife, Mattie, was the inspiration for Duke Ellington's "Satin Doll".

Discography

As sideman

With Rosemary Clooney
 1961 Rosie Solves the Swingin' Riddle! 
 1963 Love

With Buddy Collette
 1956 Man of Many Parts (Contemporary)
 1958 Buddy Collette's Swinging Shepherds (EmArcy)

With Ella Fitzgerald
 1963 Ella Fitzgerald Sings the Jerome Kern Song Book 
 1984 The Stockholm Concert, 1966 with Duke Ellington

With Gerald Wiggins
 1953 Gerald Wiggins Trio 
 1957 Wiggin' with Wig
 1961 Relax and Enjoy It

With Nancy Wilson
 1960 Something Wonderful
 1963 Broadway – My Way

With others
 1954 Musical Sounds Are the Best Sounds, Mel Tormé
 1954 The Oscar Moore Quartet with Carl Perkins, Oscar Moore
 1955 In the Land of Hi-Fi with Georgie Auld and His Orchestra, Georgie Auld (EmArcy)
 1955 It's All Over but the Swingin', Sammy Davis Jr. (Decca)
 1956 More Harry James in Hi-Fi, Harry James
 1957 Ernie Andrews, Ernie Andrews
 1958 Aspects, Benny Carter
 1959 Jump for Joy, Peggy Lee
 1959 T-Bone Blues, T-Bone Walker (Atlantic)
 1960 First, Oscar Pettiford
 1961 Al Hibbler Sings the Blues: Monday Every Day, Al Hibbler (Reprise)
 1962 Sarah + 2, Sarah Vaughan (Roulette)
 1962 Warm & Wild, Vic Dana
 1964 Sweets for the Sweet Taste of Love, Harry Edison (Vee-Jay)
 1964 Kenton / Wagner, Stan Kenton (Capitol)
 1964 Get Ready, Set, Jump!!!, Junior Mance (Capitol)
 1965 L-O-V-E, Nat King Cole (Capitol)
 1967 That Man, Robert Mitchum, Sings, Robert Mitchum (Monument)
 1976 Memoirs, Irving Ashby (Accent)

Posthumous
 2003 Harry Edison Quartet at the Haig 1953, Harry Edison (Fresh Sound)

References

1917 births
1988 deaths
20th-century American musicians
American jazz double-bassists
Male double-bassists
20th-century double-bassists
20th-century American male musicians
American male jazz musicians
King Cole Trio members